Dichopleuropus is a fungal genus in the family Lachnocladiaceae. A monotypic genus, it contains the single species Dichopleuropus spathulatus, found in Malaysia. Dichopleuropus was circumscribed by English mycologist Derek Reid in 1965.

References

External links
 

Fungi of Asia
Russulales
Monotypic Russulales genera